Annibale Pelaschiar (25 February 1912 – 29 August 1994) was an Italian sailor who competed in the 1956 Summer Olympics and in the 1964 Summer Olympics.

References

External links

1912 births
1994 deaths
Italian male sailors (sport)
Olympic sailors of Italy
Sailors at the 1956 Summer Olympics – Dragon
Sailors at the 1964 Summer Olympics – Dragon